The Communes of Angola are administrative units in Angola after municipalities. The 163 municipalities of Angola are divided into communes. There are a total of 618 communes of Angola:

Bengo Province
Ambriz
Kakalo-Kahango
Ícolo e Bengo
Cassoneca
Bela Vista
Tabi
Zala
Kikabo
Barra do Dande
Muxiluando
Kixico
Kanacassala
Gombe
Kicunzo
Kage
Mabubas
Caxito
Ucua
Piri
Kibaxe
São José das Matas
Kiaje *Paredes
Bula-Atumba
Pango-luquem
Kabiri
Bom Jesus
Catete
Calomboloca
Kazua
Muxima
Dembo Chio
Mumbondo
Kixinje

Benguela Province
Alda Lara
Asfalto
Babaera
Balombo
Benfica
Benguela
Biópio
Bocoio
Candumbo
Catumbela
Chigongo
Chikuma
Chila
Chindumbo
Chongorói
Compão
Cote
Cubal
Cubal do Lumbo
Dombe Grande
Lobito Canata
Catumbela
Egito
Monte Belo
Passe
Caimbambo
Catengue
Baia Farta
Cupupa
Imbala
Quendo
Chiongoroi
Capupa
Bolongueira
Ganda
Babaera
Kasseque
Chicurnu
Ebanga

Bié Province
Munhango
Caivera
Sachinemuna
Andulo
Belo Horizonte
Cambândua
Chicala
Chinguar
Chipeta
Chitembo
Chiuca
Chivaúlo
Dando
Gamba
Kachingues
Kaiei
Kalucinga
Kamakupa
Kangote
Kassumbe
Katabola
Kuemba
Kuito
Kunhinga
Kunje
Kutato
Kwanza
Luando
Lúbia
Malengue
Mumbué
Mutumbo
Nharea
Ringoma
Sande
Soma Kwanza
Santo António da Muinha
Trumba
Umpulo

Cabinda Province

Miconje
Luali
Cabinda
Malembo
Tanto-Zinze
Landana
Massabi
Inhuca
Necuto
Belize

Cuando Cubango Province
Baixo Longa
Bondo
Chinguanja
Cuangar
Dirico
Kaiundo
Kalai
Kuchi
Kueio
Kuito Kuanavale
Kutato
Kutuile
Longa
Luengue
Luiana
Maue

Cuanza Norte Province
Aldeia Nova
Banga
Danje - ia - Menha
Dondo
Golungo Alto
Kaenda
Kakulo
Kamabatela
Kambondo
Kanhoca
Kiangombe
Kiculungo
Kilombo dos Dembos
Kissola
Luinga
Lucala
Massangano
Maúa
Ndalatando
Quiage
Quibaxe
São Pedro da Kilemba
Samba Cajú
Samba Lukala
Tango
Zenza do Itombe
Bindo
Bolongongo
Cariamba
Terreiro
Quiquemba
Cacongo
Cerca
Camome
Cavunga
Kiluanje

Cuanza Sul Province
Assango
Botera
Dumbi
Ebo
Gabela
Gangula
Kabuta
Kalulo
Kapolo
Kariango
Kassanje
Kassongue
Kibala
Kienha
Kikombo
Kilenda
Kissanga Kungo
Kissongo
Konda
Kungo e Sanga
Kunjo
Munenga
Mussende
Ndala Kachibo
Pambangala
Quissanga
Sanga
São Lucas
Ucu–Seles
Waco Cungo
Sumbe
Porto Amboim
Quipaze
Atôme
Quirimbo
Ambovia

Cunene Province
Bangula
Cacite
Castilhos
Chitado
Evale
Humbe
Kafima
Kahama, Angola
Kalonga
Kuvati
Kuvelai
Môngua
Mukope
Mupa
Namakunde
Naulila
Ombala yo Mungu
Ondjiva
Oximolo
Shiede
Xangongo
Nehone Cafima
Evale
Simporo
yonde
Xagongo
Oncócua
Otthinjau

Huambo Province
Alto–Uama
Bailundo
Bimbe
Chiaca
Chinhama
Chinjenje
Chipipa
Chiumbo
Huambo
Kaála
Kachiungo
Kakoma
Kalenga
Kalima
Kambuengo
Katabola
Katata
Kuima
Lépi
Londuimbali
Longonjo
Lunge
Mbave
Mungo
Sambo
Tchipeio
Thicala Yhilohanga
Ukuma
Ussoke
Hengue-Caculo
Ecuma
Tchiahana
Chilata
Tchiumbo
Hungulo
Mundundo

Huíla Province
Cacula
Cacula-Sede
Capunda-Cavilongo
Chiange-Sede
Chibemba
Chibia-sede
Chicomba
Chipindo
Dongo
Galangue
Gungue
Humpata-Sede
Jamba
Jau
Kakonda
Kalépi
Kalukembe
Kassinga
Kilengue Kusse
Kutenda
Kuvango
Lubango
Matala
Ngola
Quihita
Quipungo-Sede
Tchipungo
Uaba
Santo Arina
Huila
Quilengues
Dinde
Imulo
Degola
Cusse
Bambi
Vincungo
Tchibembe
Capelango
Mulondo

Luanda Province
Bairro Operário
Barra do Cuanza
Benfica e Mussulo
Cacuaco
Camama
Cassequel
Cazenga
Corimba
Da Ilha
Futungo de Belas
Golfe (Luanda)
Havemos de Voltar
Hoji Ya Henda
Kinanga
Margal
Neves Bendinha
Ngola Kiluange
Prenda
Ramiro (Luanda)
Rangel (Luanda)
Rocha Pinto
Sambizanga
Tala Hady
Terra Nova (Luanda)
Vila Estoril
Cuca (Luanda)
Ilha do Cabo
Patrice Lumuba
Maculusso
Kilamba Kiaxi
Palanca (Luanda)
Malanga (Luanda)
Samba, Angola
Funda
Quicolo
Viana, Angola
Calumbo

Lunda Norte Province
Iongo
Kachimo
Kamaxilo
Kambulo
Kamissombo
Kanzar
Kapenda Kamulemba
Kaungula
Kuango
Lóvua
Luachimo
Luia
Luremo
Xa–Cassau
Xá-Muteba
Xinge
Lucapa
Sombo
Capaia
Thitato
Cuilo
Caluango
Iubalo
Muvulege
Luangue
Cassengue
Quitapa.

Lunda Sul Province
Alto-Chikapa
Chiluage
Dala, Angola
Kakolo
Kassai-Sul
Kukumbi
Mona-Kimbundo
Mukonda
Murieje
Saurimo
Sombo
Xassengue
Cazeje
Luma Cassai

Malanje Province
Cacuso
Cinguengue
Kacuso
Pungo-Andongo
Cuale
Quinge
Cambundy
Catembo
Dumba (Malanje)
Cabango
Tala Mungongo
Bembo (Malanje)
Caombo
Micanda
Luquembo
Capunda
Dombo
Marimba, Angola
Quimbango
Quihuhu
Muquize
Catala
Quirima
Saltar
Cazongo
Cainda
Calunda
Lumbala N'guimbo
Candundo
Macondo
Lumbala-Ngimbo
Chiume
Lumai
Lutembo
Mussuma
Ninda
Sessa
Kalamagia
Kalandula
Kambaxe
Kambo, Angola
Kambondo
Kangandala
Kangando
Karibo
Kateco-Kangola
Kaxinga
Kela
Kimambamba
Kissele
Kiuaba-Nzoji
Kizenga
Kota
Kunda-iá-Baze
Lombe
Malanje
Massango
Mikixi
Milando
Moma
Mufuma
Mukari
Ngola-Luije
Sokeko
Tembo-Aluma
Xandele

Moxico Province
Alto Zambeze
Chiume
Kaianda
Kalunda
Kamanongue
Kangamba
Kangumbe
Kavungo
Lago-Dilolo
Léua
Liangongo
Lovua
Luakano
Lukusse
Lumbala-Kakengue
Lumbala N'guimbo
Lumeje Kameia
Lutembo
Lutuai ou Muangai,
Macondo
Mussuma
Ninda
Tempué
Sessa
Cassamba
Muié

Namibe Province
Bentiaba
Bibala-Sede
Cainde
Caitou
Camacuio-Sede
Chingo (Namibe)
Kapagombe
Lola (Namibe)
Mamué
Mucaba
Muinho
Savo-Mar 
Saint Martin of the Tigers
Tômbua
Torre do Tambo
Virei-Sede
Yona (Namibe)
Namibe
Lucira

Uíge Province
Aldeia Viçosa
Alto Zaza
Bembe
Beu
Buengas
Bungo
Cambembe
Cuilo Pombo
Dimuca
Kinvuenga
Lucanga
Mabaia
Macuba
Mbanza Nnosso
Quinzala
Sacandica
Uamba
Vista Alegre (Uíge)
Uíge
Negage
Dimuca
Quisseque
Puri, Angola
Cangola
Mengo
Caiongo
Sanza Pompo
Milunga
Macocola
Massau
Macolo
Quimbele
Cuango
Icoca
Nova Esperança (Uíge)
Qitexe
Cuilo-Camboso
Cambamba
Songo
Nova Caipenba
Quipedro
Camatambo
Lembua
Petecussso
Maquela do Zombo
Quibocolo
Cuilo-Futa

Zaire Province
Kanda
Kelo
Kiende
Kindeji
Kinzau
Kiximba
Kuimba
Loje-Kibala
Luvu
Mangue Grande
Mbanza Kongo
Mbuela
Mussera
Nkalambata
Nóqui
Nzeto
Pedra de Feitiço
Soyo
Sumba
Caluca
Nadinba
Buela
Luvaca
Lufico
Mpala Lulendo
Loge
Tomboco
Quingombe
Caluca
Nadimba
Buela

See also
Provinces of Angola
Municipalities of Angola

External links
List of communes

 
Subdivisions of Angola
Angola, Communes
Angola 3
Angola geography-related lists
Angola